Frederick Appleton Smith (May 15, 1849 – February 4, 1922) was a brigadier general.

Biography
He was born in New York on May 15, 1849, to Frederick B. Smith and Sarah Durno Smith. He entered the United States Military Academy on July 1, 1869, and graduated in 1873. He then served in the Nez Perce War. He retired on May 15, 1913. On January 28, 1915, he remarried at age 64, a widow, Mrs. Hevenor, the former Emma Mandeville.

He died on February 4, 1922, and is buried in Cedar Hill Cemetery and Mausoleum, Newburgh, New York.

Publications
Personal experiences and observations during campaign in Cuba (1899)
Infantry drill regulations, United States Army (1904)

References

1849 births
1922 deaths
United States Army generals
United States Military Academy alumni